Greasy Lake is a 1988 American short drama film based on the short story "Greasy Lake" by T. Coraghessan Boyle. It was directed by Damian Harris and stars Eric Stoltz and James Spader.

Plot 
At the start of summer vacation, three 19-year-old friends set out cruising on a trip toward Greasy Lake outside Los Angeles that ends up being more eventful than they expected.

Cast
Eric Stoltz as T.C.
James Spader as Digby
Tegan West as Jeff
Cisco Pike as Bad Ass
Dirty Dick as Biker
Freaky Frank as Biker
Jeff Edwards as Hitch Hiker
Julie Dolan as Bad Ass' Girlfriend
Annabel Harris as Bad Girl #1
Denise Crosby as Bad Girl #2
Tom Waits as Narrator

Release
The film was shown at the American Film Institute Festival in 1988 and was later released with three other short films on the 1990 videocassette The Discovery Program, volume 1, distributed by JCI Video.

References

External links
 

1988 films
1988 drama films
American drama films
Films based on short fiction
Films set in Los Angeles County, California
Films directed by Damian Harris
1980s English-language films
1980s American films